Amtsberg is a municipality in the district Erzgebirgskreis, in Saxony, Germany.

Historical population
The following figures correspond to the population as of 31 December within the municipality borders as of January 2007:

 Source: Statistical office of Saxony

References 

Erzgebirgskreis